Donovan Eric Maury (born 8 May 1981) is a Belgian former football defender.

Career 
Amid interest from U.S. Lecce and Genoa C.F.C., he was signed by Luciano Gaucci at his club Perugia as part of the then-Serie A club's strategy to sign relatively unknown players from abroad. However, Maury never succeeded to break into the first team and was loaned out to Roda JC in November 2002, and then sold permanently to Serie C1 club Sambenedettese, owned by Gaucci as well at the time and mostly handled as a sort of Perugia reserve team, in 2003.

After Gaucci's exit from Sambenedettese, Maury was sold to Serie C2 club Pro Vasto in 2004; this was followed by a number of moves within the lower ranks of Italian football until 2008, when he joined then-Serie C1 club Juve Stabia. After relegation in 2009, Maury opted to stay in and became a mainstay for the team and a protagonist in two back-to-back promotions that brought the small Campanian club to Serie B in 2011. Following that, he was also awarded team captaincy at Juve Stabia.

In January 2013, Donovan Maury leaves Juve stabia to reach the luxembourgish BGL Ligue under the colors of F91 Dudelange. On 4 July 2013, he made his debut in European competition.  He plays the game of the 1st turn qualification for the UEFA Europa League against Milsami Orhei.

References

External links
 
 

1981 births
Living people
Belgian footballers
Belgian expatriate footballers
Association football defenders
Serie B players
S.S. Juve Stabia players
Roda JC Kerkrade players
A.C. Perugia Calcio players
A.S. Sambenedettese players
A.S.D. Sorrento players
Benevento Calcio players
Expatriate footballers in the Netherlands
Expatriate footballers in Italy
People from Libramont-Chevigny
Footballers from Luxembourg (Belgium)